Nicole Malliotakis (born November 11, 1980) is an American politician serving as the U.S. representative for New York's 11th congressional district since 2021. Her constituency covers Staten Island and southern Brooklyn.

Malliotakis is one of only two Republicans representing any part of New York City in Congress, and is one of four female Republican elected officials in New York City, with the other three serving on the New York City Council. In 2020, she defeated incumbent Representative Max Rose. She was the Republican nominee for mayor of New York City in the 2017 election, which she lost to incumbent Democrat Bill de Blasio.

Early life and education
Malliotakis was born on November 11, 1980, in the Manhattan borough of New York City. She moved to Staten Island when she was two years old and grew up in Great Kills, the daughter of immigrant parents; her father is from Greece and her mother from Cuba, having left in 1959 following the rise of Fidel Castro. She was raised in the Greek Orthodox faith.

Malliotakis attended New Dorp High School on Staten Island, and during her senior year was elected class president. She received a B.A. in communications from Seton Hall University and a Master of Business Administration (MBA) from Wagner College.

Early political career
Malliotakis worked as a community liaison for former State Senator John Marchi in 2003–04 and former Governor George Pataki in 2004–06. Before her election, she also worked on state energy policy as the Consolidated Edison Company of New York's public affairs manager.

In November 2015, Senator Marco Rubio of Florida named Malliotakis the New York State chair of his 2016 presidential campaign.

New York State Assembly

In 2010, Malliotakis won the election to represent the 60th District in the New York State Assembly, defeating two-term Democratic incumbent Janele Hyer-Spencer by 10 percentage points. Upon her election to the Assembly, she became the first Greek-American woman elected to office in New York State, the first Cuban-American woman elected to office in New York State, and the first person of Hispanic descent elected from Staten Island. As of January 2018, she was one of only two Republicans from the City of New York serving in the Assembly, along with Michael Reilly. Malliotakis was Brooklyn's only Republican lawmaker.

In October 2011, Malliotakis submitted an amicus curiae brief in support of an American Automobile Association lawsuit against the Port Authority in federal court, arguing that recent toll increases were illegal. She successfully brought an Article 78 proceeding in New York State Supreme Court to get the Port Authority to disclose the results of an economic impact study on the effect the toll increases had had on business at New York Container Terminal.

Malliotakis was reelected in 2012 with 61% of the vote and in 2014 with 73% of the vote in both Brooklyn and Staten Island. After U.S. Representative Michael Grimm's resignation in 2014, she was mentioned as a top contender for his seat, but decided against a run.

She made elder rights a hallmark of her tenure and successfully fought to keep a senior center in Staten Island from being closed.

Malliotakis held a series of forums on the MTA Payroll Mobility Tax and its alleged negative impact on small businesses, nonprofit organizations, and private schools. The New York state legislature and Governor Andrew Cuomo subsequently enacted significant repeals. Malliotakis fought for relief from the September 2011 toll increase on Port Authority bridges, calling for divestment of costly non-essential real estate holdings and highlighting mismanaged contributions to community organizations.

During her first year in the Assembly, Malliotakis was named a "rising star" by Capitol News, Home Reporter News, the Hispanic Coalition of New York, and the Greek America Foundation. The Business Council of New York State named her a "top-ranking pro-jobs supporter".

2017 New York City mayoral campaign

On April 25, 2017, Malliotakis filed as a Republican candidate for mayor of New York City in the 2017 election. She won the Republican nomination unopposed after businessman Paul Massey dropped out in June over money concerns. On November 7, 2017, Malliotakis lost the election to incumbent Democratic Mayor Bill de Blasio, 66–28%. She received 70% of the vote in Staten Island.

U.S. House of Representatives

Elections

2020 

In 2020, Malliotakis ran as the Republican nominee for New York's 11th congressional district against incumbent Democrat Max Rose. Her state assembly district included much of the eastern portion of the congressional district.

The race was considered the only potentially competitive House race in New York City. The 11th has long been the most conservative district of the 12 that divide New York City; it is the only one with a Cook Partisan Voting Index less than D+20, and since the 1990s it has been the only New York City-based district where Republicans usually do well. The GOP had held the seat for all but one term since 1980 before Rose won the seat in an upset in the 2018 midterm elections. The two engaged in a contentious race, with many attack ads on both sides.

Malliotakis endorsed incumbent Republican President Donald Trump in the 2020 presidential election; in turn, Trump announced, "Nicole has my Complete & Total Endorsement!" She embraced Trump's backing, saying, "I am honored by President Trump's endorsement and his words of support...I plan to defeat Max Rose and return New York's 11th Congressional District to commonsense leadership." Trump's involvement to assist Malliotakis in the race intensified over the summer, when he disparaged Rose as "terrible", a "phony", a "fraud", "weak", and a "puppet" of House Speaker Nancy Pelosi: "He shouldn't represent the people of Staten Island, who I love. That's really Trump country...I love Staten Island. [Rose] shouldn't represent the people of Staten Island; he's too weak." Malliotakis's campaign echoed Trump's sentiments: "President Trump is right; Max Rose is a fraud and a puppet of Nancy Pelosi."

Malliotakis declared victory upon taking a commanding lead in election day returns on November 3. Rose did not immediately concede, citing absentee votes yet to be counted. As it became apparent that Malliotakis's lead was too large to overcome, Rose conceded on November 12. Malliotakis took 53% of the vote to Rose's 46.8%.

2022 

In 2022, Malliotakis ran for re-election to a second term against former Democratic congressman Max Rose in a rematch of her previous race.

Malliotakis declared victory on election night, and Rose conceded defeat shortly afterwards; Malliotakis took 60.9% of the vote to Rose's 39.1%.

Tenure 
In January 2021, Malliotakis was appointed as the Assistant Minority Whip for the Republican Conference, the House Committees On Foreign Affairs and Transportation & Infrastructure, as well as the Select Subcommittee on the Coronavirus.

On February 4, 2021, Malliotakis joined 10 other Republican House members and all Democrats in voting to strip Marjorie Taylor Greene of her House Education and Labor Committee and House Budget Committee assignments in response to controversial political statements she had made. Malliotakis called Greene’s comments "extraordinarily offensive and hurtful to thousands of 9/11 families and first responders, our Jewish community and many others in my district."

On November 5, 2021, Malliotakis joined 12 other Republicans in voting for the Infrastructure Investment and Jobs Act, which passed the House 228–206.

In January of 2023, Malliotakis was selected to serve on the House Committee on Ways and Means in the 118th Congress; she is the only House member from New York City to serve on the committee this term and the first Republican from the city to serve on the committee in 30 years.

Committee assignments 

 House Committee on Ways and Means
 Subcommittee on Tax
 Subcommittee on Oversight
 House Select Subcommittee on the Coronavirus Crisis
 Assistant Whip for the House Republican Conference

Caucus memberships 
 Conservative Climate Caucus
 Republican Governance Group
 Republican Study Committee
Republican Main Street Partnership
 Congressional Hellenic Caucus 
 Congressional Hellenic Israel Alliance Caucus
 Republican Israel Caucus
 US-Lebanon Friendship Caucus
 Congressional Zoo and Aquarium Caucus
 Law Enforcement Caucus
 Armenian Caucus
 SALT Caucus
 Congressional Taiwan Caucus
 Congressional Egypt Caucus
 Congressional Cigar Caucus
 Friends of Ireland Caucus
 Congressional Hispanic Conference Caucus

Political positions
During her time in Congress, the American Conservative Union, a political action committee (PAC) supporting US American conservatism, gave her a 66% score for voting in line with its positions while the American Civil Liberties Union, a PAC associated with US American liberalism and libertarianism, gave her a 0% score. Upon her election to Congress, Malliotakis indicated an intent to join other freshman Republicans in forming a counterweight to oppose the so-called "Squad" of progressive Democrats led by fellow New York City congresswoman Alexandria Ocasio-Cortez. "We have a group of new Republicans who love America. We value freedom, liberty, and opportunity", Malliotakis said, referencing several other newly elected members of Congress whose families escaped from Communist regimes, such as Carlos Giménez and Maria Elvira Salazar of Florida and Victoria Spartz of Indiana. "Freedom for a strong economy. Less government. That's why our families fled oppressive regimes. Our families fled from oppressive countries with the very same policies that AOC and the Squad are promoting." The coalition is known as the Freedom Force.

2020 election
Shortly after Joe Biden defeated Trump in the 2020 presidential election, Malliotakis refused to acknowledge Biden's win, echoing Trump's refusal to concede the election. In the aftermath, Malliotakis supported Trump's false claims of election fraud.
On January 6, 2021, Malliotakis voted to object to counting either Arizona's or Pennsylvania's electoral votes in the 2020 presidential election based on disproved allegations of voter fraud and unconstitutional procedures. On January 9, more than 300 protesters, including seven New York City and New York State elected officials, gathered outside her Brooklyn office to call for her to either vote to impeach Trump or resign, noting that her vote to object to the election results was premised on spurious voter-fraud theories that had motivated a violent, armed attack on the U.S. Capitol. On January 13, she voted against Trump's second impeachment for inciting the storming of the Capitol.

Abortion
As a state legislator, she received a 100% rating in 2011 from the New York State Right to Life Committee, an anti-abortion PAC, and a 50% rating in 2019 from Planned Parenthood Empire State, a pro-abortion rights PAC, indicating how often she voted with their positions. During her run for mayor, she said, "I am not against abortion." She does not support overturning Roe v. Wade, but has voted against taxpayer-funded abortions and against New York state's late-term abortion bill. During her run for mayor, she did not identify as pro-life or pro-choice, saying, "it's not black or white. I think there's a lot of things that go into a decision of that magnitude." But in her congressional campaign, she identified as pro-life, even as she reiterated that she does not "hold black-and-white views" on abortion.

COVID-19
Malliotakis voted against the American Rescue Plan in 2021, but after its passage, she touted aspects of the legislation as one of her "achievements".

Donald Trump
Malliotakis voted for Trump in the 2016 presidential election and opposes sanctuary city status for undocumented immigrants in New York City. During her mayoral campaign, she said that she regretted voting for Trump and that she would "write in Marco Rubio so that I could tell you I voted for Marco Rubio." In 2020, however, she endorsed and said that she voted for Trump.

Gun policy
On legislation relating to firearms and gun ownership, Malliotakis received an 8% rating from the Gun Owners of America, a PAC opposing gun control laws, and a 33% from the National Rifle Association, another PAC opposing gun control legislation.

Healthcare 
During the covid-19 pandemic Malliotakis voted to cut Medicaid funding.

Immigration
Malliotakis has repeatedly called for the implementation of additional security measures on the border between the United States and Mexico.

While in the State Assembly, Malliotakis stated she was "against New York State extending licenses for illegal immigrants".

Infrastructure
On November 5, 2021, Malliotakis was among the 13 House Republicans who voted with a majority of Democrats to pass the Infrastructure Investment and Jobs Act, a $1.2 trillion infrastructure spending bill.

LGBT rights
After originally opposing same-sex marriage, Malliotakis said she regretted that position and voted to support adoptions by same-sex parents and to protect estate rights for married same-sex couples. She voted against a bill relating to bathroom rights for transgender people. Malliotakis also voted against the Equality Act. She has been endorsed by Log Cabin Republicans, a Republican PAC in favor of same-sex marriage and other LGBTQ rights.

On July 19, 2022, Malliotakis and 46 other Republican Representatives voted for the Respect for Marriage Act, which would codify the right to same-sex marriage in federal law. She said, "In 2017, I expressed my deep regret for voting against a bill legalizing same-sex marriage in New York State while in the state Assembly six years prior. Over the past decade, I have attended two weddings of couples who deserve equal recognition and protection under the law." On December 8, 2022, she and 38 other Republican Representatives voted for the final passage of the Respect for Marriage Act.

Taxes
Malliotakis opposed raising fees on plastic bags in New York and supports reducing bridge tolls. She proposed a plan to cut property taxes for seniors and to limit increases on property taxes. When running for mayor, she argued that these reforms in property taxes would mean the wealthy would pay a fair share while poorer residents would get tax relief.

Big Tech
In 2022, Malliotakis was one of 39 Republicans to vote for the Merger Filing Fee Modernization Act of 2022, an antitrust package that would crack down on corporations for anti-competitive behavior.

Electoral history

Personal life
Malliotakis is multilingual, speaking English and Spanish fluently and some Greek. She was baptized into the Greek Orthodox Church.

See also
List of Hispanic and Latino Americans in the United States Congress
Women in the United States House of Representatives

References

External links

 Representative Nicole Malliotakis official U.S. House website
York State Assembly site
Campaign site

|-

|-

|-

 
|-

1980 births
21st-century American women politicians
American people of Greek descent
American politicians of Cuban descent
Female members of the United States House of Representatives
Greek Orthodox Christians from the United States
Hispanic and Latino American members of the United States Congress
Hispanic and Latino American women in politics
Living people
Republican Party members of the New York State Assembly
Politicians from Staten Island
Republican Party members of the United States House of Representatives from New York (state)
Seton Hall University alumni
Wagner College alumni
Women state legislators in New York (state)
New Dorp High School alumni
People from Great Kills, Staten Island
Latino conservatism in the United States
21st-century American politicians
Eastern Orthodox Christians from New York (state)
Eastern Orthodox Christians from the United States